The Quran (vocalized Arabic: , Quranic Arabic:   , 'the recitation'), also romanized Qur'an or Koran, is the central religious text of Islam, believed by Muslims to be a revelation from God. It is organized in 114 chapters (pl.:  ,), which consist of verses (pl.:  , sing.:  ,). In addition to its religious significance, it is widely regarded as the finest work in Arabic literature, and has significantly influenced the Arabic language.

Muslims believe that the Quran was orally revealed by God to the final prophet, Muhammad, through the archangel Gabriel incrementally over a period of some 23 years, beginning in the month of Ramadan, when Muhammad was 40; and concluding in 632, the year of his death. Muslims regard the Quran as Muhammad's most important miracle; a proof of his prophethood; and the culmination of a series of divine messages starting with those revealed to Adam, including the Torah, the Psalms and the Gospel. The word Quran occurs some 70 times in the text itself, and other names and words are also said to refer to the Quran.

The Quran is believed by Muslims to be not simply divinely inspired, but the literal word of God. Muhammad did not write it as he did not know how to write. According to tradition, several of Muhammad's companions served as scribes, recording the revelations. Shortly after the prophet's death, the Quran was compiled by the companions, who had written down or memorized parts of it. Caliph Uthman established a standard version, now known as the Uthmanic codex, which is generally considered the archetype of the Quran known today. There are, however, variant readings, with mostly minor differences in meaning.

The Quran assumes familiarity with major narratives recounted in the Biblical and apocryphal scriptures. It summarizes some, dwells at length on others and, in some cases, presents alternative accounts and interpretations of events. The Quran describes itself as a book of guidance for humankind. It sometimes offers detailed accounts of specific historical events, and it often emphasizes the moral significance of an event over its narrative sequence. Supplementing the Quran with explanations for some cryptic Quranic narratives, and rulings that also provide the basis for Islamic law in most denominations of Islam, are hadiths—oral and written traditions believed to describe words and actions of Muhammad.  During prayers, the Quran is recited only in Arabic.

Someone who has memorized the entire Quran is called a hafiz. Ideally, verses are recited with a special kind of elocution reserved for this purpose, called tajwid. During the month of Ramadan, Muslims typically complete the recitation of the whole Quran during tarawih prayers. In order to extrapolate the meaning of a particular Quranic verse, Muslims rely on exegesis, or commentary rather than a direct translation of the text.

Etymology and meaning 
The word  appears about 70 times in the Quran itself, assuming various meanings. It is a verbal noun of the Arabic verb  meaning 'he read' or 'he recited'. While some Western scholars consider the word to be derived from the Syriac, the majority of Muslim authorities hold the origin of the word is  itself. Regardless, it had become an Arabic term by Muhammad's lifetime. An important meaning of the word is the 'act of reciting', as reflected in an early Quranic passage: "It is for Us to collect it and to recite it."

In other verses, the word refers to 'an individual passage recited [by Muhammad]'. Its liturgical context is seen in a number of passages, for example: "So when  is recited, listen to it and keep silent." The word may also assume the meaning of a codified scripture when mentioned with other scriptures such as the Torah and Gospel.

The term also has closely related synonyms that are employed throughout the Quran. In the large majority of contexts, usually with a definite article (al-), the word is referred to as the waḥy ('revelation'), that which has been "sent down" (tanzīl) at intervals.

The Quran describes itself as 'the discernment', 'the mother book', 'the guide', 'the wisdom', 'the remembrance', and 'the revelation' ('something sent down', signifying the descent of an object from a higher place to lower place). The term mus'haf ('written work') is often used to refer to particular Quranic manuscripts but is also used in the Quran to identify earlier revealed books.

History

Prophetic era 
Islamic tradition relates that Muhammad received his first revelation in the Cave of Hira during one of his isolated retreats to the mountains. Thereafter, he received revelations over a period of 23 years. According to hadith and Muslim history, after Muhammad immigrated to Medina and formed an independent Muslim community, he ordered many of his companions to recite the Quran and to learn and teach the laws, which were revealed daily. It is related that some of the Quraysh who were taken prisoners at the Battle of Badr regained their freedom after they had taught some of the Muslims the simple writing of the time. Thus a group of Muslims gradually became literate. As it was initially spoken, the Quran was recorded on tablets, bones, and the wide, flat ends of date palm fronds. Most suras were in use amongst early Muslims since they are mentioned in numerous sayings by both Sunni and Shia sources, relating Muhammad's use of the Quran as a call to Islam, the making of prayer and the manner of recitation. However, the Quran did not exist in book form at the time of Muhammad's death in 632. There is agreement among scholars that Muhammad himself did not write down the revelation.

Sahih al-Bukhari narrates Muhammad describing the revelations as, "Sometimes it is (revealed) like the ringing of a bell" and Aisha reported, "I saw the Prophet being inspired Divinely on a very cold day and noticed the sweat dropping from his forehead (as the Inspiration was over)." Muhammad's first revelation, according to the Quran, was accompanied with a vision. The agent of revelation is mentioned as the "one mighty in power," the one who "grew clear to view when he was on the uppermost horizon. Then he drew nigh and came down till he was (distant) two bows' length or even nearer." The Islamic studies scholar Welch states in the Encyclopaedia of Islam that he believes the graphic descriptions of Muhammad's condition at these moments may be regarded as genuine, because he was severely disturbed after these revelations. According to Welch, these seizures would have been seen by those around him as convincing evidence for the superhuman origin of Muhammad's inspirations. However, Muhammad's critics accused him of being a possessed man, a soothsayer or a magician since his experiences were similar to those claimed by such figures well known in ancient Arabia. Welch additionally states that it remains uncertain whether these experiences occurred before or after Muhammad's initial claim of prophethood.

The Quran describes Muhammad as "," which is traditionally interpreted as 'illiterate', but the meaning is rather more complex. Medieval commentators such as Al-Tabari maintained that the term induced two meanings: first, the inability to read or write in general; second, the inexperience or ignorance of the previous books or scriptures (but they gave priority to the first meaning). Muhammad's illiteracy was taken as a sign of the genuineness of his prophethood. For example, according to Fakhr al-Din al-Razi, if Muhammad had mastered writing and reading he possibly would have been suspected of having studied the books of the ancestors. Some scholars such as Watt prefer the second meaning of —they take it to indicate unfamiliarity with earlier sacred texts.

The final verse of the Quran was revealed on the 18th of the Islamic month of Dhu al-Hijjah in the year 10 A.H., a date that roughly corresponds to February or March 632. The verse was revealed after the Prophet finished delivering his sermon at Ghadir Khumm.

Compilation and preservation 

Following Muhammad's death in 632, a number of his companions who knew the Quran by heart were killed in the Battle of Yamama by Musaylimah. The first caliph, Abu Bakr (d. 634), subsequently decided to collect the book in one volume so that it could be preserved. Zayd ibn Thabit (d. 655) was the person to collect the Quran since "he used to write the Divine Inspiration for Allah's Apostle". Thus, a group of scribes, most importantly Zayd, collected the verses and produced a hand-written manuscript of the complete book. The manuscript according to Zayd remained with Abu Bakr until he died. Zayd's reaction to the task and the difficulties in collecting the Quranic material from parchments, palm-leaf stalks, thin stones (collectively known as ) and from men who knew it by heart is recorded in earlier narratives. In 644, Muhammad's widow Hafsa bint Umar was entrusted with the manuscript until the third caliph, Uthman ibn Affan, requested the standard copy from her.

In about 650, Uthman (d. 656) began noticing slight differences in pronunciation of the Quran as Islam expanded beyond the Arabian Peninsula into Persia, the Levant, and North Africa. In order to preserve the sanctity of the text, he ordered a committee headed by Zayd to use Abu Bakr's copy and prepare a standard text of the Quran.  Thus, within 20 years of Muhammad's death, the Quran was committed to written form.  That text became the model from which copies were made and promulgated throughout the urban centers of the Muslim world, and other versions are believed to have been destroyed. The present form of the Quran text is accepted by Muslim scholars to be the original version compiled by Abu Bakr.

According to Shia, Ali ibn Abi Talib (d. 661) compiled a complete version of the Quran shortly after Muhammad's death. The order of this text differed from that gathered later during Uthman's era in that this version had been collected in chronological order. Despite this, he made no objection against the standardized Quran and accepted the Quran in circulation. Other personal copies of the Quran might have existed including Ibn Mas'ud's and Ubay ibn Ka'b's codex, none of which exist today.

The Quran most likely existed in scattered written form during Muhammad's lifetime. Several sources indicate that during Muhammad's lifetime a large number of his companions had memorized the revelations. Early commentaries and Islamic historical sources support the above-mentioned understanding of the Quran's early development. University of Chicago professor Fred Donner states that:[T]here was a very early attempt to establish a uniform consonantal text of the Qurʾān from what was probably a wider and more varied group of related texts in early transmission.… After the creation of this standardized canonical text, earlier authoritative texts were suppressed, and all extant manuscripts—despite their numerous variants—seem to date to a time after this standard consonantal text was established.Although most variant readings of the text of the Quran have ceased to be transmitted, some still are. There has been no critical text produced on which a scholarly reconstruction of the Quranic text could be based. Historically, controversy over the Quran's content has rarely become an issue, although debates continue on the subject.

In 1972, in a mosque in the city of Sana'a, Yemen, manuscripts were discovered that were later proved to be the most ancient Quranic text known to exist at the time. The Sana'a manuscripts contain palimpsests, a manuscript page from which the text has been washed off to make the parchment reusable again—a practice which was common in ancient times due to the scarcity of writing material. However, the faint washed-off underlying text is still barely visible and believed to be "pre-Uthmanic" Quranic content, while the text written on top is believed to belong to Uthmanic times. Studies using radiocarbon dating indicate that the parchments are dated to the period before 671 CE with a 99 percent probability. The German scholar Gerd R. Puin has been investigating these Quran fragments for years. His research team made 35,000 microfilm photographs of the manuscripts, which he dated to the early part of the 8th century. Puin has not published the entirety of his work, but noted unconventional verse orderings, minor textual variations, and rare styles of orthography. He also suggested that some of the parchments were palimpsests which had been reused. Puin believed that this implied an evolving text as opposed to a fixed one.

In 2015, fragments of a very early Quran, dating back to 1370 years earlier, were discovered in the library of the University of Birmingham, England. According to the tests carried out by the Oxford University Radiocarbon Accelerator Unit, "with a probability of more than 95%, the parchment was from between 568 and 645". The manuscript is written in Hijazi script, an early form of written Arabic. This is possibly the earliest extant exemplar of the Quran, but as the tests allow a range of possible dates, it cannot be said with certainty which of the existing versions is the oldest. Saudi scholar Saud al-Sarhan has expressed doubt over the age of the fragments as they contain dots and chapter separators that are believed to have originated later. However Joseph E. B. Lumbard of Brandeis University has written in the Huffington Post in support of the dates proposed by the Birmingham scholars. Lumbard notes that the discovery of a Quranic text that may be confirmed by radiocarbon dating as having been written in the first decades of the Islamic era, while presenting a text substantially in conformity with that traditionally accepted, reinforces a growing academic consensus that many Western skeptical and 'revisionist' theories of Quranic origins are now untenable in the light of empirical findings—whereas, on the other hand, counterpart accounts of Quranic origins within classical Islamic traditions stand up well in the light of ongoing scientific discoveries.

Significance in Islam 

Muslims believe the Quran to be God's final revelation to humanity, a work of divine guidance revealed to Muhammad through the angel Gabriel.

Revered by pious Muslims as "the holy of holies," whose sound moves some to "tears and ecstasy", it is the physical symbol of the faith, the text often used as a charm on occasions of birth, death, marriage. Consequently,
 It must never rest beneath other books, but always on top of them, one must never drink or smoke when it is being read aloud, and it must be listened to in silence. It is a talisman against disease and disaster.Ibn Warraq, Why I'm Not a Muslim, 1995: p.105
Traditionally great emphasis was put on children memorizing the 6,200+ verses of the Quran, those succeeding being honored with the title Hafiz. "Millions and millions" of Muslims "refer to the Koran daily to explain their actions and to justify their aspirations," and in recent years many consider it the source of scientific knowledge.

Revelation in Islamic and Quranic contexts means the act of God addressing an individual, conveying a message for a greater number of recipients. As the Quran says, "With the truth we (God) have sent it down and with the truth it has come down."

The Quran frequently asserts in its text that it is divinely ordained. Some verses in the Quran seem to imply that even those who do not speak Arabic would understand the Quran if it were recited to them. The Quran refers to a written pre-text, "the preserved tablet," that records God's speech even before it was sent down.

Muslims believe that the present wording of the Quran corresponds to that revealed to Muhammad, and according to their interpretation of Quran , it is protected from corruption ("Indeed, it is We who sent down the Quran and indeed, We will be its guardian."). Muslims consider the Quran to be a guide, a sign of the prophethood of Muhammad and the truth of the religion.

The Shīa believe that the Quran was gathered and compiled by Muhammad during his lifetime, rather than being compiled by Uthman ibn Affan.  There are other differences in the way Shias interpret the text. Muslims do not agree over whether the Quran was created by God or is eternal and "uncreated."  Sunnis (who make up about 85–90% of Muslims) hold that the Quran is uncreated—a doctrine that has been unchallenged among them for many centuries. Shia Twelvers and Zaydi, and the Kharijites—believe the Quran was created. Sufi philosophers view the question as artificial or wrongly framed.

Inimitability 

Inimitability of the Quran (or "") is the belief that no human speech can match the Quran in its content and form. The Quran is considered an inimitable miracle by Muslims, effective until the Day of Resurrection—and, thereby, the central proof granted to Muhammad in authentication of his prophetic status. The concept of inimitability originates in the Quran where in five different verses opponents are challenged to produce something like the Quran: "If men and jinn banded together to produce the like of this Quran they would never produce its like not though they backed one another." From the ninth century, numerous works appeared which studied the Quran and examined its style and content. Medieval Muslim scholars including al-Jurjani (d. 1078) and al-Baqillani (d. 1013) have written treatises on the subject, discussed its various aspects, and used linguistic approaches to study the Quran. Others argue that the Quran contains noble ideas, has inner meanings, maintained its freshness through the ages and has caused great transformations at the individual level and in history. Some scholars state that the Quran contains scientific information that agrees with modern science. The doctrine of the miraculousness of the Quran is further emphasized by Muhammad's illiteracy since the unlettered prophet could not have been suspected of composing the Quran.

In worship 

The first surah of the Quran is repeated in daily prayers and on other occasions. This surah, which consists of seven verses, is the most often recited surah of the Quran:

Other sections of the Quran of choice are also read in daily prayers.

Respect for the written text of the Quran is an important element of religious faith by many Muslims, and the Quran is treated with reverence. Based on tradition and a literal interpretation of Quran  ("none shall touch but those who are clean"), some Muslims believe that they must perform a ritual cleansing with water (wudu or ghusl) before touching a copy of the Quran, although this view is not universal. Worn-out copies of the Quran are wrapped in a cloth and stored indefinitely in a safe place, buried in a mosque or a Muslim cemetery, or burned and the ashes buried or scattered over water.

In Islam, most intellectual disciplines, including Islamic theology, philosophy, mysticism and jurisprudence, have been concerned with the Quran or have their foundation in its teachings.

In Islamic art 
The Quran also inspired Islamic arts and specifically the so-called Quranic arts of calligraphy and illumination. The Quran is never decorated with figurative images, but many Qurans have been highly decorated with decorative patterns in the margins of the page, or between the lines or at the start of suras. Islamic verses appear in many other media, on buildings and on objects of all sizes, such as mosque lamps, metal work, pottery and single pages of calligraphy for muraqqas or albums.

Text and arrangement 

The Quran consists of 114 chapters of varying lengths, each known as a sūrah. Chapters are classified as Meccan or Medinan, depending on whether the verses were revealed before or after the migration of Muhammad to the city of Medina. However, a sūrah classified as Medinan may contain Meccan verses in it and vice versa. Sūrah titles are derived from a name or quality discussed in the text, or from the first letters or words of the sūrah. Chapters are not arranged in chronological order, rather the chapters appear to be arranged roughly in order of decreasing size. Some scholars argue the sūrahs are arranged according to a certain pattern. Each sūrah except the ninth starts with the Bismillah, an Arabic phrase meaning 'In the name of God.' There are, however, still 114 occurrences of the Bismillah in the Quran, due to its presence in Quran  as the opening of Solomon's letter to the Queen of Sheba.

Each sūrah consists of several verses, known as āyāt, which originally means a 'sign' or 'evidence' sent by God. The number of verses differs from sūrah to sūrah. An individual verse may be just a few letters or several lines. The total number of verses in the most popular Hafs Quran is 6,236; however, the number varies if the bismillahs are counted separately.

In addition to and independent of the division into chapters, there are various ways of dividing the Quran into parts of approximately equal length for convenience in reading. The 30 juz' (plural ) can be used to read through the entire Quran in a month. Some of these parts are known by names—which are the first few words by which the  begins. A  is sometimes further divided into two ḥizb (plural ), and each  subdivided into four . The Quran is also divided into seven approximately equal parts, manzil (plural ), for it to be recited in a week.

A different structure is provided by semantic units resembling paragraphs and comprising roughly ten  each. Such a section is called a rukū`.

The Muqattaʿat ('disjoined letters, disconnected letters'; also 'mysterious letters') are combinations of between one and five Arabic letters figuring at the beginning of 29 out of the 114 chapters of the Quran just after the basmala. The letters are also known as fawātih, or 'openers', as they form the opening verse of their respective suras. Four surahs are named for their : Ṭāʾ-Hāʾ, Yāʾ-Sīn, Ṣād, and  Qāf. The original significance of the letters is unknown. Tafsir (exegesis) has interpreted them as abbreviations for either names or qualities of God or for the names or content of the respective surahs. According to Rashad Khalifa, those letters are Quranic initials for a hypothetical mathematical code in the Quran, namely the Quran code or known as Code 19.

According to one estimate the Quran consists of 77,430 words, 18,994 unique words, 12,183 stems, 3,382 lemmas and 1,685 roots.

Contents 

The Quranic content is concerned with basic Islamic beliefs including the existence of God and the resurrection. Narratives of the early prophets, ethical and legal subjects, historical events of Muhammad's time, charity and prayer also appear in the Quran. The Quranic verses contain general exhortations regarding right and wrong and historical events are related to outline general moral lessons. Verses pertaining to natural phenomena have been interpreted by Muslims as an indication of the authenticity of the Quranic message. The style of the Quran has been called "allusive," with commentaries needed to explain what is being referred to—"events are referred to, but not narrated; disagreements are debated without being explained; people and places are mentioned, but rarely named."

Monotheism 
The central theme of the Quran is monotheism. God is depicted as living, eternal, omniscient and omnipotent (see, e.g., Quran ,). God's omnipotence appears above all in his power to create. All human beings are equal in their utter dependence upon God, and their well-being depends upon their acknowledging that fact and living accordingly.

The Quran uses cosmological and contingency arguments in various verses without referring to the terms to prove the existence of God. Therefore, the universe is originated and needs an originator, and whatever exists must have a sufficient cause for its existence. Besides, the design of the universe is frequently referred to as a point of contemplation: "It is He who has created seven heavens in harmony. You cannot see any fault in God's creation; then look again: Can you see any flaw?"

Eschatology 

The doctrine of the last day and eschatology (the final fate of the universe) may be considered the second great doctrine of the Quran. It is estimated that approximately one-third of the Quran is eschatological, dealing with the afterlife in the next world and with the day of judgment at the end of time. There is a reference to the afterlife on most pages of the Quran and belief in the afterlife is often referred to in conjunction with belief in God as in the common expression: "Believe in God and the last day." A number of suras such as 44, 56, 75, 78, 81 and 101 are directly related to the afterlife and its preparations. Some suras indicate the closeness of the event and warn people to be prepared for the imminent day. For instance, the first verses of Sura 22, which deal with the mighty earthquake and the situations of people on that day, represent this style of divine address: "O People! Be respectful to your Lord. The earthquake of the Hour is a mighty thing."

The Quran is often vivid in its depiction of what will happen at the end time. Watt describes the Quranic view of End Time:The climax of history, when the present world comes to an end, is referred to in various ways. It is 'the Day of Judgment,' 'the Last Day,' 'the Day of Resurrection,' or simply 'the Hour.' Less frequently it is 'the Day of Distinction' (when the good are separated from the evil), 'the Day of the Gathering' (of men to the presence of God) or 'the Day of the Meeting' (of men with God). The Hour comes suddenly. It is heralded by a shout, by a thunderclap, or by the blast of a trumpet. A cosmic upheaval then takes place. The mountains dissolve into dust, the seas boil up, the sun is darkened, the stars fall and the sky is rolled up. God appears as Judge, but his presence is hinted at rather than described.… The central interest, of course, is in the gathering of all mankind before the Judge. Human beings of all ages, restored to life, join the throng. To the scoffing objection of the unbelievers that former generations had been dead a long time and were now dust and mouldering bones, the reply is that God is nevertheless able to restore them to life.The Quran does not assert a natural immortality of the human soul, since man's existence is dependent on the will of God: when he wills, he causes man to die; and when he wills, he raises him to life again in a bodily resurrection.

Prophets 
According to the Quran, God communicated with man and made his will known through signs and revelations. Prophets, or 'Messengers of God', received revelations and delivered them to humanity. The message has been identical and for all humankind. "Nothing is said to you that was not said to the messengers before you, that your lord has at his Command forgiveness as well as a most Grievous Penalty." The revelation does not come directly from God to the prophets. Angels acting as God's messengers deliver the divine revelation to them. This comes out in Quran , in which it is stated: "It is not for any mortal that God should speak to them, except by revelation, or from behind a veil, or by sending a messenger to reveal by his permission whatsoever He will."

Ethico-religious concepts 

Belief is a fundamental aspect of morality in the Quran, and scholars have tried to determine the semantic contents of "belief" and "believer" in the Quran. The ethico-legal concepts and exhortations dealing with righteous conduct are linked to a profound awareness of God, thereby emphasizing the importance of faith, accountability, and the belief in each human's ultimate encounter with God. People are invited to perform acts of charity, especially for the needy. Believers who "spend of their wealth by night and by day, in secret and in public" are promised that they "shall have their reward with their Lord; on them shall be no fear, nor shall they grieve." It also affirms family life by legislating on matters of marriage, divorce, and inheritance. A number of practices, such as usury and gambling, are prohibited. The Quran is one of the fundamental sources of Islamic law (sharia). Some formal religious practices receive significant attention in the Quran including the formal prayers (salat) and fasting in the month of Ramadan. As for the manner in which the prayer is to be conducted, the Quran refers to prostration. The term for charity, zakat, literally means purification. Charity, according to the Quran, is a means of self-purification.

Encouragement for the sciences 
The astrophysicist Nidhal Guessoum, while being highly critical of pseudo-scientific claims made about the Quran, has highlighted the encouragement for sciences that the Quran provides by developing "the concept of knowledge." He writes:The Qur'an draws attention to the danger of conjecturing without evidence (And follow not that of which you have not the (certain) knowledge of... 17:36) and in several different verses asks Muslims to require proofs (Say: Bring your proof if you are truthful 2:111), both in matters of theological belief and in natural science.Guessoum cites Ghaleb Hasan on the definition of "proof" according to the Quran being "clear and strong... convincing evidence or argument." Also, such a proof cannot rely on an argument from authority, citing verse 5:104. Lastly, both assertions and rejections require a proof, according to verse 4:174. Ismail al-Faruqi and Taha Jabir Alalwani are of the view that any reawakening of the Muslim civilization must start with the Quran; however, the biggest obstacle on this route is the "centuries old heritage of tafseer (exegesis) and other classical disciplines" which inhibit a "universal, epidemiological and systematic conception" of the Quran's message. The philosopher Muhammad Iqbal, considered the Quran's methodology and epistemology to be empirical and rational.

There are around 750 verses in the Quran dealing with natural phenomena. In many of these verses the study of nature is "encouraged and highly recommended", and historical Islamic scientists like Al-Biruni and Al-Battani derived their inspiration from verses of the Quran. Mohammad Hashim Kamali has stated that "scientific observation, experimental knowledge and rationality" are the primary tools with which humanity can achieve the goals laid out for it in the Quran. Ziauddin Sardar built a case for Muslims having developed the foundations of modern science, by highlighting the repeated calls of the Quran to observe and reflect upon natural phenomenon.

The physicist Abdus Salam, in his Nobel Prize banquet address, quoted a well known verse from the Quran (67:3–4) and then stated: "This in effect is the faith of all physicists: the deeper we seek, the more is our wonder excited, the more is the dazzlement of our gaze." One of Salam's core beliefs was that there is no contradiction between Islam and the discoveries that science allows humanity to make about nature and the universe. Salam also held the opinion that the Quran and the Islamic spirit of study and rational reflection was the source of extraordinary civilizational development. Salam highlights, in particular, the work of Ibn al-Haytham and Al-Biruni as the pioneers of empiricism who introduced the experimental approach, breaking with Aristotle's influence and thus giving birth to modern science. Salam was also careful to differentiate between metaphysics and physics, and advised against empirically probing certain matters on which "physics is silent and will remain so," such as the doctrine of "creation from nothing" which in Salam's view is outside the limits of science and thus "gives way" to religious considerations.

Literary style 

The Quran's message is conveyed with various literary structures and devices. In the original Arabic, the suras and verses employ phonetic and thematic structures that assist the audience's efforts to recall the message of the text. Muslims assert (according to the Quran itself) that the Quranic content and style is inimitable.

The language of the Quran has been described as "rhymed prose" as it partakes of both poetry and prose; however, this description runs the risk of failing to convey the rhythmic quality of Quranic language, which is more poetic in some parts and more prose-like in others. Rhyme, while found throughout the Quran, is conspicuous in many of the earlier Meccan suras, in which relatively short verses throw the rhyming words into prominence. The effectiveness of such a form is evident for instance in Sura 81, and there can be no doubt that these passages impressed the conscience of the hearers. Frequently a change of rhyme from one set of verses to another signals a change in the subject of discussion. Later sections also preserve this form but the style is more expository.

The Quranic text seems to have no beginning, middle, or end, its nonlinear structure being akin to a web or net. The textual arrangement is sometimes considered to exhibit lack of continuity, absence of any chronological or thematic order and repetitiousness. Michael Sells, citing the work of the critic Norman O. Brown, acknowledges Brown's observation that the seeming disorganization of Quranic literary expression—its scattered or fragmented mode of composition in Sells's phrase—is in fact a literary device capable of delivering profound effects as if the intensity of the prophetic message were shattering the vehicle of human language in which it was being communicated. Sells also addresses the much-discussed repetitiveness of the Quran, seeing this, too, as a literary device.

A text is self-referential when it speaks about itself and makes reference to itself. According to Stefan Wild, the Quran demonstrates this metatextuality by explaining, classifying, interpreting and justifying the words to be transmitted. Self-referentiality is evident in those passages where the Quran refers to itself as revelation, remembrance (dhikr), news, criterion in a self-designating manner (explicitly asserting its Divinity, "And this is a blessed Remembrance that We have sent down; so are you now denying it?"), or in the frequent appearance of the "Say" tags, when Muhammad is commanded to speak (e.g., "Say: 'God's guidance is the true guidance'," "Say: 'Would you then dispute with us concerning God?'"). According to Wild the Quran is highly self-referential. The feature is more evident in early Meccan suras.

Interpretation 

The Quran has sparked much commentary and explication, aimed at explaining the "meanings of the Quranic verses, clarifying their import and finding out their significance."

Tafsir is one of the earliest academic activities of Muslims. According to the Quran, Muhammad was the first person who described the meanings of verses for early Muslims. Other early exegetes included a few Companions of Muhammad, such as Abu Bakr, 'Umar ibn al-Khattab, 'Uthman ibn 'Affan, ʻAli ibn Abi Talib, 'Abdullah ibn Mas'ood, ʻAbdullah ibn Abbas, Ubayy ibn Kaʻb, Zayd ibn Thaabit, Abu Moosaa al-Ash’ari, and ‘Abdullah ibn al-Zubayr. Exegesis in those days was confined to the explanation of literary aspects of the verse, the background of its revelation and, occasionally, interpretation of one verse with the help of the other. If the verse was about a historical event, then sometimes a few traditions (hadith) of Muhammad were narrated to make its meaning clear.

Because the Quran is spoken in classical Arabic, many of the later converts to Islam (mostly non-Arabs) did not always understand the Quranic Arabic, they did not catch allusions that were clear to early Muslims fluent in Arabic and they were concerned with reconciling apparent conflict of themes in the Quran. Commentators erudite in Arabic explained the allusions, and perhaps most importantly, explained which Quranic verses had been revealed early in Muhammad's prophetic career, as being appropriate to the very earliest Muslim community, and which had been revealed later, canceling out or "abrogating" the earlier text. Other scholars, however, maintain that no abrogation has taken place in the Quran.

There have been several commentaries of the Quran by scholars of all denominations, popular ones include Tafsir ibn Kathir, Tafsir al-Jalalayn, Tafsir Al Kabir, Tafsir al-Tabari. More modern works of Tafsir include Ma'ariful Qur'an written by Mufti Muhammad Shafi and Risale-i Nur by Bediüzzaman Said Nursi.

Esoteric interpretation 

Esoteric or Sufi interpretation attempts to unveil the inner meanings of the Quran. Sufism moves beyond the apparent point of the verses and instead relates Quranic verses to the inner or esoteric (batin) and metaphysical dimensions of consciousness and existence. According to Sands, esoteric interpretations are more suggestive than declarative, they are allusions rather than explanations (tafsir). They indicate possibilities as much as they demonstrate the insights of each writer.

Sufi interpretation, according to Annabel Keeler, also exemplifies the use of the theme of love, as for instance can be seen in Qushayri's interpretation of the Quran:

Moses, in 7:143, comes the way of those who are in love, he asks for a vision but his desire is denied, he is made to suffer by being commanded to look at other than the Beloved while the mountain is able to see God. The mountain crumbles and Moses faints at the sight of God's manifestation upon the mountain. In Qushayri's words, Moses came like thousands of men who traveled great distances, and there was nothing left to Moses of Moses. In that state of annihilation from himself, Moses was granted the unveiling of the realities. From the Sufi point of view, God is the always the beloved and the wayfarer's longing and suffering lead to realization of the truths.

Muhammad Husayn Tabatabaei says that according to the popular explanation among the later exegetes,  indicates the particular meaning a verse is directed towards. In Tabatabaei's view, what has been rightly called , or hermeneutic interpretation of the Quran, is not concerned simply with the denotation of words. Rather, it is concerned with certain truths and realities that transcend the comprehension of the common run of men; yet it is from these truths and realities that the principles of doctrine and the practical injunctions of the Quran issue forth. Interpretation is not the meaning of the verse—rather it transpires through that meaning, in a special sort of transpiration. There is a spiritual reality—which is the main objective of ordaining a law, or the basic aim in describing a divine attribute—and then there is an actual significance that a Quranic story refers to.

According to Shia beliefs, those who are firmly rooted in knowledge like Muhammad and the imams know the secrets of the Quran. According to Tabatabaei, the statement "none knows its interpretation except God" remains valid, without any opposing or qualifying clause. Therefore, so far as this verse is concerned, the knowledge of the Quran's interpretation is reserved for God. But Tabatabaei uses other verses and concludes that those who are purified by God know the interpretation of the Quran to a certain extent.

According to Tabatabaei, there are acceptable and unacceptable esoteric interpretations. Acceptable ta'wil refers to the meaning of a verse beyond its literal meaning; rather the implicit meaning, which ultimately is known only to God and can't be comprehended directly through human thought alone. The verses in question here refer to the human qualities of coming, going, sitting, satisfaction, anger and sorrow, which are apparently attributed to God. Unacceptable  is where one "transfers" the apparent meaning of a verse to a different meaning by means of a proof; this method is not without obvious inconsistencies. Although this unacceptable  has gained considerable acceptance, it is incorrect and cannot be applied to the Quranic verses. The correct interpretation is that reality a verse refers to. It is found in all verses, the decisive and the ambiguous alike; it is not a sort of a meaning of the word; it is a fact that is too sublime for words. God has dressed them with words to bring them a bit nearer to our minds; in this respect they are like proverbs that are used to create a picture in the mind, and thus help the hearer to clearly grasp the intended idea.

History of Sufi commentaries 
One of the notable authors of esoteric interpretation prior to the 12th century is Sulami (d. 1021) without whose work the majority of very early Sufi commentaries would not have been preserved. Sulami's major commentary is a book named  ('Truths of Exegesis') which is a compilation of commentaries of earlier Sufis. From the 11th century onwards several other works appear, including commentaries by Qushayri (d. 1074), Daylami (d. 1193), Shirazi (d. 1209) and Suhrawardi (d. 1234). These works include material from Sulami's books plus the author's contributions. Many works are written in Persian such as the works of Maybudi (d. 1135)  ('the unveiling of the secrets'). Rumi (d. 1273) wrote a vast amount of mystical poetry in his book Mathnawi. Rumi makes heavy use of the Quran in his poetry, a feature that is sometimes omitted in translations of Rumi's work. Rumi's book is not exceptional for containing citations from and elaboration on the Quran, however, Rumi does mention Quran more frequently. Simnani (d. 1336) wrote two influential works of esoteric exegesis on the Quran. He reconciled notions of God's manifestation through and in the physical world with the sentiments of Sunni Islam. Comprehensive Sufi commentaries appear in the 18th century such as the work of Ismail Hakki Bursevi (d. 1725). His work  ('the Spirit of Elucidation') is a voluminous exegesis. Written in Arabic, it combines the author's own ideas with those of his predecessors (notably Ibn Arabi and Ghazali).

Levels of meaning 
 
Unlike the Salafis and Zahiri, Shias and Sufis as well as some other Muslim philosophers believe the meaning of the Quran is not restricted to the literal aspect. For them, it is an essential idea that the Quran also has inward aspects. Henry Corbin narrates a hadith that goes back to Muhammad:

The Quran possesses an external appearance and a hidden depth, an exoteric meaning and an esoteric meaning. This esoteric meaning in turn conceals an esoteric meaning (this depth possesses a depth, after the image of the celestial Spheres, which are enclosed within each other). So it goes on for seven esoteric meanings (seven depths of hidden depth).

According to this view, it has also become evident that the inner meaning of the Quran does not eradicate or invalidate its outward meaning. Rather, it is like the soul, which gives life to the body. Corbin considers the Quran to play a part in Islamic philosophy, because gnosiology itself goes hand in hand with prophetology.

Commentaries dealing with the zahir ('outward aspects') of the text are called , and hermeneutic and esoteric commentaries dealing with the batin are called ta'wil ('interpretation' or 'explanation'), which involves taking the text back to its beginning. Commentators with an esoteric slant believe that the ultimate meaning of the Quran is known only to God. In contrast, Quranic literalism, followed by Salafis and Zahiris, is the belief that the Quran should only be taken at its apparent meaning.

Reappropriation 
Reappropriation is the name of the hermeneutical style of some ex-Muslims who have converted to Christianity. Their style or reinterpretation can sometimes be geared towards apologetics, with less reference to the Islamic scholarly tradition that contextualizes and systematizes the reading (e.g., by identifying some verses as abrogated). This tradition of interpretation draws on the following practices: grammatical renegotiation, renegotiation of textual preference, retrieval, and concession.

Translations 

Translating the Quran has always been problematic and difficult. Many argue that the Quranic text cannot be reproduced in another language or form. Furthermore, an Arabic word may have a range of meanings depending on the context, making an accurate translation even more difficult.

Nevertheless, the Quran has been translated into most African, Asian, and European languages. The first translator of the Quran was Salman the Persian, who translated surat al-Fatiha into Persian during the seventh century. Another translation of the Quran was completed in 884 in Alwar (Sindh, India, now Pakistan) by the orders of Abdullah bin Umar bin Abdul Aziz on the request of the Hindu Raja Mehruk.

The first fully attested complete translations of the Quran were done between the 10th and 12th centuries in Persian. The Samanid king, Mansur I (961–976), ordered a group of scholars from Khorasan to translate the Tafsir al-Tabari, originally in Arabic, into Persian. Later in the 11th century, one of the students of Abu Mansur Abdullah al-Ansari wrote a complete tafsir of the Quran in Persian. In the 12th century, Najm al-Din Abu Hafs al-Nasafi translated the Quran into Persian. The manuscripts of all three books have survived and have been published several times.

Islamic tradition also holds that translations were made for Emperor Negus of Abyssinia and Byzantine Emperor Heraclius, as both received letters by Muhammad containing verses from the Quran. In early centuries, the permissibility of translations was not an issue, but whether one could use translations in prayer.

In 1936, translations in 102 languages were known. In 2010, the Hürriyet Daily News and Economic Review reported that the Quran was presented in 112 languages at the 18th International Quran Exhibition in Tehran.

Robert of Ketton's 1143 translation of the Quran for Peter the Venerable, Lex Mahumet pseudoprophete, was the first into a Western language (Latin).
Alexander Ross offered the first English version in 1649, from the French translation of L'Alcoran de Mahomet (1647) by Andre du Ryer. In 1734, George Sale produced the first scholarly translation of the Quran into English; another was produced by Richard Bell in 1937, and yet another by Arthur John Arberry in 1955. All these translators were non-Muslims. There have been numerous translations by Muslims. Popular modern English translations by Muslims include The Oxford World Classic's translation by Muhammad Abdel Haleem, The Clear Quran by Dr Mustafa Khattab, Sahih International's translation, among various others.

As with translations of the Bible, the English translators have sometimes favored archaic English words and constructions over their more modern or conventional equivalents; for example, two widely read translators, Abdullah Yusuf Ali and Marmaduke Pickthall, use the plural and singular ye and thou instead of the more common you.

The oldest Gurmukhi translation of the Quran Sharif has been found in village Lande of Moga district of Punjab which was printed in 1911.

Recitation

Rules of recitation 

The proper recitation of the Quran is the subject of a separate discipline named tajwid which determines in detail how the Quran should be recited, how each individual syllable is to be pronounced, the need to pay attention to the places where there should be a pause, to elisions, where the pronunciation should be long or short, where letters should be sounded together and where they should be kept separate, etc. It may be said that this discipline studies the laws and methods of the proper recitation of the Quran and covers three main areas: the proper pronunciation of consonants and vowels (the articulation of the Quranic phonemes), the rules of pause in recitation and of resumption of recitation, and the musical and melodious features of recitation.

In order to avoid incorrect pronunciation, reciters follow a program of training with a qualified teacher. The two most popular texts used as references for  rules are Matn al-Jazariyyah by Ibn al-Jazari and Tuhfat al-Atfal by Sulayman al-Jamzuri.

The recitations of a few Egyptian reciters, like El Minshawy, Al-Hussary, Abdul Basit, Mustafa Ismail, were highly influential in the development of current styles of recitation. Southeast Asia is well known for world-class recitation, evidenced in the popularity of the woman reciters such as Maria Ulfah of Jakarta. Today, crowds fill auditoriums for public Quran recitation competitions.

There are two types of recitation:

  is at a slower pace, used for study and practice.
 Mujawwad refers to a slow recitation that deploys heightened technical artistry and melodic modulation, as in public performances by trained experts. It is directed to and dependent upon an audience for the  reciter seeks to involve the listeners.

Variant readings 

Vocalization markers indicating specific vowel sounds (tashkeel) were introduced into the text of the Qur'an during the lifetimes of the last Sahabah. The first Quranic manuscripts lacked these marks, enabling multiple possible recitations to be conveyed by the same written text. The 10th-century Muslim scholar from Baghdad, Ibn Mujāhid, is famous for establishing seven acceptable textual readings of the Quran. He studied various readings and their trustworthiness and chose seven 8th-century readers from the cities of Mecca, Medina, Kufa, Basra and Damascus. Ibn Mujahid did not explain why he chose seven readers, rather than six or ten, but this may be related to a prophetic tradition (Muhammad's saying) reporting that the Quran had been revealed in seven ahruf (meaning seven letters or modes). Today, the most popular readings are those transmitted by Ḥafṣ (d. 796) and Warsh (d. 812) which are according to two of Ibn Mujahid's reciters, Aasim ibn Abi al-Najud (Kufa, d. 745) and Nafi‘ al-Madani (Medina, d. 785), respectively. The influential standard Quran of Cairo uses an elaborate system of modified vowel-signs and a set of additional symbols for minute details and is based on ʻAsim's recitation, the 8th-century recitation of Kufa. This edition has become the standard for modern printings of the Quran.

The variant readings of the Quran are one type of textual variant. According to Melchert (2008), the majority of disagreements have to do with vowels to supply, most of them in turn not conceivably reflecting dialectal differences and about one in eight disagreements has to do with whether to place dots above or below the line.

Nasser categorizes variant readings into various subtypes, including internal vowels, long vowels, gemination (shaddah), assimilation and alternation.

Occasionally, an early Quran shows compatibility with a particular reading. A Syrian manuscript from the 8th century is shown to have been written according to the reading of Ibn Amir ad-Dimashqi. Another study suggests that this manuscript bears the vocalization of himsi region.

Writing and printing

Writing 

Before printing was widely adopted in the 19th century, the Quran was transmitted in manuscripts made by calligraphers and copyists. The earliest manuscripts were written in Ḥijāzī-typescript. The Hijazi style manuscripts nevertheless confirm that transmission of the Quran in writing began at an early stage. Probably in the ninth century, scripts began to feature thicker strokes, which are traditionally known as Kufic scripts. Toward the end of the ninth century, new scripts began to appear in copies of the Quran and replace earlier scripts. The reason for discontinuation in the use of the earlier style was that it took too long to produce and the demand for copies was increasing. Copyists would therefore choose simpler writing styles. Beginning in the 11th century, the styles of writing employed were primarily the naskh, muhaqqaq, rayḥānī and, on rarer occasions, the thuluth script. Naskh was in very widespread use. In North Africa and Iberia, the Maghribī style was popular. More distinct is the Bihari script which was used solely in the north of India. Nastaʻlīq style was also rarely used in Persian world.

In the beginning, the Quran was not written with dots or tashkeel. These features were added to the text during the lifetimes of the last of the Sahabah. Since it would have been too costly for most Muslims to purchase a manuscript, copies of the Quran were held in mosques in order to make them accessible to people. These copies frequently took the form of a series of 30 parts or juzʼ. In terms of productivity, the Ottoman copyists provide the best example. This was in response to widespread demand, unpopularity of printing methods and for aesthetic reasons.

Whilst the majority of Islamic scribes were men, some women also worked as scholars and copyists; one such woman who made a copy of this text was the Moroccan jurist, Amina, bint al-Hajj ʿAbd al-Latif.

Printing 

Wood-block printing of extracts from the Quran is on record as early as the 10th century.

Arabic movable type printing was ordered by Pope Julius II (r. 1503–1512) for distribution among Middle Eastern Christians. The first complete Quran printed with movable type was produced in Venice in 1537–1538 for the Ottoman market by Paganino Paganini and Alessandro Paganini. But this Quran was not used as it contained a large number of errors. Two more editions include those published by the pastor Abraham Hinckelmann in Hamburg in 1694, and by Italian priest Ludovico Maracci in Padua in 1698 with Latin translation and commentary.

Printed copies of the Quran during this period met with strong opposition from Muslim legal scholars: printing anything in Arabic was prohibited in the Ottoman empire between 1483 and 1726—initially, even on penalty of death. The Ottoman ban on printing in Arabic script was lifted in 1726 for non-religious texts only upon the request of Ibrahim Muteferrika, who printed his first book in 1729. Except for books in Hebrew and European languages, which were unrestricted, very few books, and no religious texts, were printed in the Ottoman Empire for another century.

In 1786, Catherine the Great of Russia, sponsored a printing press for "Tatar and Turkish orthography" in Saint Petersburg, with one Mullah Osman Ismail responsible for producing the Arabic types. A Quran was printed with this press in 1787, reprinted in 1790 and 1793 in Saint Petersburg, and in 1803 in Kazan. The first edition printed in Iran appeared in Tehran (1828), a translation in Turkish was printed in Cairo in 1842, and the first officially sanctioned Ottoman edition was finally printed in Constantinople between 1875 and 1877 as a two-volume set, during the First Constitutional Era.

Gustav Flügel published an edition of the Quran in 1834 in Leipzig, which remained authoritative in Europe for close to a century, until Cairo's Al-Azhar University published an edition of the Quran in 1924. This edition was the result of a long preparation, as it standardized Quranic orthography, and it remains the basis of later editions.

Criticism 

Regarding the claim of divine origin, critics refer to preexisting sources, not only taken from the Bible, supposed to be older revelations of God, but also from heretic, apocryphic and talmudic sources, such as The Syriac Infancy Gospel and Gospel of James. However the Bible was not translated into Arabic until after the completion of the Quran with other Judeo-Christian sources being translated even later. Due to rejection of Crucifixion of Jesus in the Quran, some scholars also suspect Manichaean, a dualistic religion believing in two eternal forces, influences on the Quran.

The  believe the Quran predicts scientific knowledge, relating the author to non-human origin. Critics argue, verses which allegedly explain modern scientific facts, about subjects such as biology, evolution of the earth, and human life, contain fallacies and are unscientific. Most claims of predictions rely on the ambiguity of the Arabic language, another point of criticism. Despite calling itself a clear book, the Quranic language lacks clarity.

Other criticisms point at the moral attitude asserted by the Quran. Examples include the Sword Verse, which some interpret as promoting violence against "pagans", and An-Nisa, 34, which some view as excusing domestic violence.

Relationship with other literature 

Some non-Muslim groups such as the Baháʼí Faith and Druze view the Quran as holy. In the Baháʼí Faith, the Quran is accepted as authentic revelation from God along with the revelations of the other world religions, Islam being a stage within in the divine process of progressive revelation. Bahá’u’lláh, the Prophet-Founder of the Baháʼí Faith, testified to the validity of the Quran, writing, "Say: Perused ye not the Qur’án? Read it, that haply ye may find the Truth, for this Book is verily the Straight Path. This is the Way of God unto all who are in the heavens and all who are on the earth." Unitarian Universalists may also seek inspiration from the Quran. It has been suggested that the Quran has some narrative similarities to the Diatessaron, Protoevangelium of James, Infancy Gospel of Thomas, Gospel of Pseudo-Matthew and the Arabic Infancy Gospel. One scholar has suggested that the Diatessaron, as a gospel harmony, may have led to the conception that the Christian Gospel is one text.

The Bible 

The Quran attributes its relationship with former books (the Torah and the Gospels) to their unique origin, saying all of them have been revealed by the one God.

According to Christoph Luxenberg (in The Syro-Aramaic Reading of the Koran) the Quran's language was similar to the Syriac language. The Quran recounts stories of many of the people and events recounted in Jewish and Christian sacred books (Tanakh, Bible) and devotional literature (Apocrypha, Midrash), although it differs in many details. Adam, Enoch, Noah, Eber, Shelah, Abraham, Lot, Ishmael, Isaac, Jacob, Joseph, Job, Jethro, David, Solomon, Elijah, Elisha, Jonah, Aaron, Moses, Zechariah, John the Baptist and Jesus are mentioned in the Quran as prophets of God (see Prophets of Islam). In fact, Moses is mentioned more in the Quran than any other individual. Jesus is mentioned more often in the Quran than Muhammad (by name—Muhammad is often alluded to as "The Prophet" or "The Apostle"), while Mary is mentioned in the Quran more than in the New Testament.

Arab writing 
After the Quran, and the general rise of Islam, the Arabic alphabet developed rapidly into an art form. The Arabic grammarian Sibawayh wrote one of the earliest books on Arabic grammar, referred to as "Al-Kitab", which relied heavily on the language in the Quran. Wadad Kadi, Professor of Near Eastern Languages and Civilizations at University of Chicago, and Mustansir Mir, Professor of Islamic studies at Youngstown State University, state that the Quran exerted a particular influence on Arabic literature's diction, themes, metaphors, motifs and symbols and added new expressions and new meanings to old, pre-Islamic words that would become ubiquitous.

See also 

 Criticism of the Quran
 Digital Quran
 Hadith of the Quran and Sunnah
 Historical reliability of the Quran
 Islamic schools and branches
 List of chapters in the Quran
 List of translations of the Quran
 Quran and miracles
 Quran code
 Quran translations
 Schools of Islamic theology
 Violence in the Quran
 Women in the Quran
 The True Furqan

References

Notes

Citations

Sources

Further reading

Introductory texts

Traditional Quranic commentaries (tafsir)

Topical studies

Literary criticism 
 
 .

Encyclopedias

Academic journals 
 Journal of Qur'anic Studies, published by the School of Oriental and African Studies
 Journal of Qur'anic Research and Studies, published by King Fahd Qur'an Printing Complex

External links

Reference material 
 The British Library: Discovering Sacred Texts – Islam

Manuscripts 
 Several digitised Qurans in the Cambridge University Digital Library
 2017-232-1 al-Qurʼān. / القرآن at OPenn

Quran browsers and translation 
 Al-Quran.info
 Quran Archive – Texts and Studies on the Quran
 Quran text and translation at Tufts University
 Tanzil – Online Quran Navigator
 Quran.com
 Multilingual Quran (Arabic, English, French, German, Dutch, Spanish, Italian)

 
7th-century books
Islamic theology
Islamic texts
Medieval literature
Religious texts
Islamic terminology
Miracles attributed to Muhammad
7th-century Arabic books